Amjad Javed Saleemi is a former Pakistani police officer who served as Inspector General of Sindh Police (IGSP) and Inspector General of Punjab Police (IGPP).He joined the Police Service of Pakistan in 1986 and belongs to the 14th Common Training Programme of the Civil Service. He Belongs to Arain family of Punjab.

Career
Saleemi served as IGSP until 6 September 2018 and was later appointed as IGPP and served on that post until 15 April 2019. He was a Grade 22 officer at the time of his latest removal from Police Service of Pakistan as IGPP.

See also
Central Superior Services

References

Inspector Generals of Sindh Police
Punjab Police (Pakistan)
Year of birth missing (living people)
Place of birth missing (living people)
Living people